Gloria Klein was an American painter based in New York City. Klein was a member of the Criss-Cross art cooperative.

Work 
Klein's work is primarily geometric and nonrepresentational, and she is considered a founding member of the Pattern and Decoration movement. Her work is included in the permanent collection at the Blanton Museum of Art.

Exhibitions 
Klein's work has been shown in solo and group exhibitions from the 1970s to the early 2010s, including three solo exhibitions at Gallery 128 in New York City. The feminist art publication Heresies included Klein's 1977 work Untitled in their "Lesbian Art and Artists" issue. Klein's works were also exhibited in "A Lesbian Show" at 112 Greene Street Workshop in New York, in 1978, which was curated by Harmony Hammond.

In addition to having her work featured, Klein has also organized exhibitions, including the Geometrics show reviewed by the New York Times.

References  

American women painters
20th-century American painters
Painters from New York City
21st-century American painters
Living people
Year of birth missing (living people)
20th-century American women
21st-century American women